Martletwy is a village, parish and community in the county of Pembrokeshire, Wales.

Description
Martletwy lies in south of the county, the nearest town is Narberth some 7 miles distant to its north and east. It lies mainly to the west of the A4075 road, which links Carew in the south with the Canaston Bridge junction at the A40 road, although part of the Cross Hands area bridges the main road. To the west and south, the area's boundary is the Eastern Cleddau, to the southeast the River Cresswell forms its boundary.

History
According to Lewis, the population of the parish in 1833 was 725. He described the area as good arable and pasture land, which was enclosed, and considerable supplies of coal and culm on the estate of Sir John Owen, which was shipped from a specially-constructed quay at Landshipping on the Eastern Cleddau.

Historic building
Blackpool Mill is a Grade II-listed disused mill dating to 1813 which is intact and contains working machinery. It was operational until the Second World War and in 2017 plans for its development as a heritage attraction were being considered.

Martletwy parish
The parish church is dedicated to St Marcellus and is in the diocese of St David's. There are Baptist, Methodist and Independent chapels.

Martletwy Community
Martletwy consists of the following villages: Martletwy, Coedcanlas, Minwear, Newton North, Landshipping and Lawrenny.

Governance
A Martletwy electoral ward exists, though this ward stretches beyond the confines of Martletwy community, covering the neighbouring Llawhaden and Uzmaston, Boulston and Slebech. It had a total population at the 2011 Census of 1,970.

Notable places
The village is best known for being home to the Oakwood theme park.

References

External links 

Contact details for Martletwy Community Council

 
Villages in Pembrokeshire
Communities in Pembrokeshire